Rudderless (German: Steuerlos) is a 1924 German silent film directed by Gennaro Righelli and starring Maria Jacobini, Rosa Valetti and Charles Willy Kayser.

The film's sets were designed by the art director Fritz Kraenke.

Cast
 Maria Jacobini  
 Rosa Valetti 
 Charles Willy Kayser 
 Heinrich George 
 Olga Engl
 Karl Platen 
 Philipp Manning 
 Joseph Kustendi 
 Viktor Senger 
 Clementine Plessner

References

Bibliography
 Hans-Michael Bock and Tim Bergfelder. The Concise Cinegraph: An Encyclopedia of German Cinema. Berghahn Books.

External links
 

1924 films
Films of the Weimar Republic
Films directed by Gennaro Righelli
German silent feature films
German black-and-white films